The New Caledonia Super Ligue 2014 season was the 41st season of the FCF since its establishment in 1962. The season began on 6 March 2014. Gaïtcha represented the New Caledonia Super Ligue in the 2014–15 OFC Champions League after finishing Champions respectively in the 2013 New Caledonia Super Ligue competition.

The league was won by Magenta undefeated.

Clubs

Standings
AS Kirikitr was relegated as worst team from outside Grande Terre. Half the league was deducted points after the season.

References

External links
Season at soccerway.com

New Caledonia Super Ligue seasons
New
Super Ligue